Harold Harvey Mason KC (28 January 1890 – 8 May 1949)  was an Australian politician who represented the Electoral district of Woollahra from 26 June 1937 until 24 February 1938 as an Independent United Australia Party MP.
 
Mason was the son of William Henry Mason, shipping master of the Port of Sydney, and Sarah Jane Dunn. He married Marjorie Frances Macken on 18 December 1914 and had one daughter and three sons with each other. He died on 8 May 1949 in Canberra, Australian Capital Territory, Australia. His funeral was held at Northern Suburbs crematorium from St Mark's Church of England, Darling Point, Sydney.

Mason was admitted as a King's Counsel in 1939.

References

1890 births
1949 deaths
Independent members of the Parliament of New South Wales
Members of the New South Wales Legislative Assembly
Australian King's Counsel
20th-century Australian politicians